William Alfred Getsom (11 January 1885 – 6 August 1954) was an  Australian rules footballer who played with Geelong in the Victorian Football League (VFL).

Notes

External links 

1885 births
1954 deaths
Australian rules footballers from Victoria (Australia)
Geelong Football Club players